Ura-Kesa-Gatame is one of the variations of Kuzure-Kesa-Gatame, a mat hold, listed in The Canon Of Judo.

Technique description

Escapes

Submissions

Technique history

Included systems 
Lists:
The Canon Of Judo
Judo technique

Similar techniques, variants, and aliases 
English aliases:
Back scarf hold
Similar:
Kuzure-Kesa-Gatame

Judo technique